The 50 members of the Parliament of Vanuatu from 1995 to 1998 were elected on 30 November 1995.

List of members

References

 1995